Kūh-e Zābī is a mountain in western Afghanistan. with Elevation. 2850m.

References

Mountains of Afghanistan